Ekrem Kılıçarslan (born 22 August 1997) is a Turkish professional footballer who plays as a goalkeeper for Turkish club Göztepe on loan from  Gaziantep.

Career
Kılıçarslan is a youth product of Hastane Bayırıspor, Dardanelspor and Eskişehirspor. He began his senior career with Eskişehirspor as their backup goalkeeper, signing his first professional contract on 15 October 2016. After 5 years with the club where he eventually became starter, Kılıçarslan signed with the Süper Lig club Hatayspor on 1 February 2021. He transferred to Gaziantep on 5 August 2021. He made his professional debut with Gaziantep in a 1–1 Süper Lig tie with Çaykur Rizespor on 20 May 2022.

References

External links

1997 births
Living people
Sportspeople from Çanakkale
Turkish footballers
Association football goalkeepers
Eskişehirspor footballers
Hatayspor footballers
Gaziantep F.K. footballers
Göztepe S.K. footballers
Süper Lig players
TFF First League players